Leoncio Veloso (16 August 1897 – 5 October 1971) was a Chilean footballer. He played in three matches for the Chile national football team in 1926. He was also part of Chile's squad for the 1926 South American Championship.

References

External links
 

1897 births
1971 deaths
Chilean footballers
Chile international footballers
Place of birth missing
Association football defenders
Badminton F.C. footballers
Chilean football managers
Magallanes managers